Roger-Philippe Menu (30 June 1948 – 4 February 2013 in Lille) is a retired French swimmer who won two silver medals in the 4 × 100 m medley relay and 100 m breaststroke at the 1970 European Aquatics Championships; he finished sixth in the 200 m breaststroke. He also competed in these three events at the 1972 Summer Olympics, but did not reach the finals.

References

1948 births
2013 deaths
Swimmers at the 1972 Summer Olympics
Olympic swimmers of France
French male breaststroke swimmers
European Aquatics Championships medalists in swimming